Herradura (Spanish: "horseshoe") are architectural features associated with the Ancestral Puebloan road network. Herraduras are found on hills and berms near Chacoan roads. Many of them are oriented so the opening faces east. They are thought to have indicated changes in road direction. They are not believed to have been residential, but the presence of broken pottery near them suggests they might have been roadside shrines.

References

Bibliography

 

Archaeological sites in New Mexico
Chaco Canyon
Chaco Culture National Historical Park
Colorado Plateau
Ancestral Puebloans